Myrtilus is a Greek name which can refer to: 

Myrtilus, a person from ancient Greek mythology
a poet of ancient comedy (5th century B.C)
the ancient name of Kissamos Gulf in Crete